Van der Hoek is a surname, and may refer to:

 André van der Hoek, Dutch-American computer scientist
 Frans Robert Jan van der Hoek known as Roberto Vander (born 1950) Dutch-born Chilean actor and singer
 Hans van der Hoek (1933–2017), Dutch footballer
 Jan van der Hoek (born 1940), Dutch volleyball player
 Rosalie van der Hoek (born 1994), Dutch tennis player
 Zeke Vanderhoek, American teacher and entrepreneur

See also
 Van den Hoek